Arkady Semyonovich Ukupnik (born February 18, 1953, Kamianets-Podilskyi, Khmelnytskyi Oblast, Ukrainian Soviet Socialist Republic) is a  Russian composer, pop singer, actor, and producer.

Honoured Artist of Russia (2004).

In 2017 he became a member of the jury of 3rd Moscow Jewish Film Festival.

Selected filmography
Moths Games (2004)
Kiss through a Wall (2011)
All Inclusive (2011)

References

External links

 Официальный сайт
 Аркадий Семёнович Укупник // Народный биографический справочник. Сайт Eternaltown.com.ua

1953 births
Living people
People from Kamianets-Podilskyi
Soviet composers
Soviet male composers
Russian Jews
Ukrainian Jews
Russian composers
Russian male composers
Russian film score composers
Russian record producers
Honored Artists of the Russian Federation
Russian songwriters
Russian people of Ukrainian descent
Male film score composers
20th-century Russian male singers
20th-century Russian singers